Nashville Now was an American talk show that focused on country music performers in the style of The Tonight Show. The show aired live on weeknights on TNN from 1983–1993. The host was Nashville TV/radio personality Ralph Emery. The show was nominated for an ACE Award in 1987 for Music Series. Emery's sidekick was Shotgun Red, a puppet performed by Steve Hall. It originated from TNN's studio ("Gaslight Theater") at Opryland USA in Nashville. It was demolished after suffering heavy damage in the 2010 Tennessee floods.

Reruns of Nashville Now were added to the relaunched Nashville Network on November 1, 2012.  The show is now jointly owned by Viacom and the Country Music Hall of Fame and Museum in Nashville TN

References

External links

Country Music Hall of Fame

1983 American television series debuts
1993 American television series endings
1980s American television talk shows
1990s American television talk shows
1980s American variety television series
1990s American variety television series
English-language television shows
American television shows featuring puppetry
Television shows filmed in Tennessee
The Nashville Network original programming